Foresti is a surname. Notable people with the surname include: 

Bruno Foresti (1923–2022), Italian Catholic prelate
Eleuterio Felice Foresti (1789–1858), Italian patriot and scholar
Florence Foresti (born 1973), French comedian and actress
Giacomo Filippo Foresti (1434–1520), Augustinian monk and author
Gianfranco Foresti (born 1950), Italian racing cyclist
Lucas Foresti (born 1992), Brazilian racing driver
Pietro Foresti (born 1977), Italian music producer, engineer, and manager
Traute Foresti (1915–2015), Austrian poet and actress